The Rada of the Belarusian Democratic Republic (Rada BNR) was the governing body of the Belarusian Democratic Republic. Since 1919, the Rada BNR has been in exile where it has preserved its existence among the Belarusian diaspora as an advocacy group promoting support to Belarusian independence and democracy in Belarus among Western policymakers. , the Rada BNR is the oldest existing government in exile.

Formation

The Rada BNR was founded as the executive body of the First All-Belarusian Congress, held in Minsk in December 1917 with over 1800 participants from different regions of Belarus including representatives of Belarusian national organisations, regional zemstva, main Christian denominations and Belarusian Jewish political parties. The work of the Congress was violently interrupted by the Bolsheviks.

After retreat of the Bolsheviks from Minsk, the Rada (council) declared itself supreme power in Belarus. After the Bolsheviks and the Germans had signed the Treaty of Brest-Litovsk the Rada declared independence of Belarus as the sovereign Belarusian Democratic Republic.

As of 25 March 1918 the Rada BNR had 77 members including:
 36 elected at the All-Belarusian Congress
 6 representatives of the Belarusian community of Vilnius
 15 representatives of ethnic minorities (Russian, Polish, Jewish)
 10 representatives of local authorities
 10 representatives of major cities

Germany did not give official recognition to Belarus and hindered the activities of the institutions of the Belarusian Democratic Republic. Nevertheless, the Rada managed to start organising its governing bodies in different parts of the country as well as working on establishing a national Belarusian army and a national education system.

The Rada established official diplomatic contacts with several states including Finland, the Ukrainian People's Republic, Czechoslovakia, the Baltic States, Turkey and others.

With the approach of Bolshevik armies to Minsk the Rada was forced to relocate to Vilnius, then to Hrodna and eventually, upon coordination with the Republic of Lithuania, to Kaunas.

In exile

1919–1947
In April 1919, the Polish army seized Hrodna and Vilnius. Jozef Pilsudski issued the Proclamation to the inhabitants of the former Grand Duchy of Lithuania stating that the new Polish administration would grant them cultural and political autonomy. The proclamation was welcomed by the Belarusian leadership, especially considering Soviet plans for the Sovietization of Belarus. However, in later negotiations with the Belarusian leaders Pilsudski proposed to limit the Belarusian government's functions to purely cultural issues, which was rejected by the Belarusian prime minister Anton Luckievic. The government of Belarus managed to include a statement for minorities' rights in Poland in the resolutions of the Paris Peace Conference.

The government of the Belarusian Democratic Republic protested the Polish military mobilization in the area of Vilnius, the Polish elections held there, and the annexation of the Augustów area to Poland. They also appealed to the League of Nations, Great Britain, France, the United States and other countries to recognize the independence of Belarus.

In late 1920, the Belarusian government began negotiations anew with the Bolsheviks in Moscow and tried to persuade them to recognize the independence of Belarus and to release Belarusian political prisoners being held in Russian jails. The negotiations were unsuccessful.

On 11 November 1920, the Belarusian Democratic Republic signed a partnership treaty with the Republic of Lithuania to cooperate in liberating Belarusian and Lithuanian lands from Polish occupation.

After the establishment of the Belarusian Soviet Socialist Republic (Belarusian SSR) as part of the USSR, several members of the Rada laid down their mandates in 1925 and returned to Belarus. Officially the Rada BNR never recognized the Belarusian SSR. Most of the members of the Rada who returned to Belarus, including former Prime Minister Vaclau Lastouski, were later killed in the Soviet terror in Belarus in the 1930s.

During the Second World War and the German occupation of Czechoslovakia the Rada refused to cooperate with the Nazis or recognize the collaborationist government of Belarus, the Belarusian Central Rada.

After the Second World War

The advance of the Red Army in 1945 forced the Rada of the BNR to relocate to the Western part of Germany, occupied by British and American troops.

In February 1948, the Rada passed a special manifesto, by which it declared its return to activity. In April 1948 the Rada, together with representatives of the Belarusian post-war refugees, held a conference in Osterhofen, Bavaria.

The primary activities of the Rada BNR in the West were lobbying and contacts with Western governments to ensure recognition of Belarus as a separate country. Together with other anti-Soviet organisations in the West, including governments in exile of Ukraine and the Baltic countries, the Rada protested against human rights violations in the Soviet Union. In the 1950s the Rada BNR enabled the creation of the Belarusian edition of Radio Free Europe. Members of the Rada organized support to Belarus following the Chernobyl accident of 1986.

After dissolution of the USSR

After the dissolution of the Soviet Union in the 1990s, similar governments-in-exile of the neighboring countries (Lithuania, Poland and others) handed back their mandates to the corresponding independent governments.

Upon declaration of independence of the Republic of Belarus in 1990, interest in the Belarusian Democratic Republic increased in Belarusian society. The Belarusian Popular Front, which was the main pro-Perestroika anti-Communist opposition party, called for the restoration of an independent Belarus, in the form of the Belarusian Democratic Republic, starting in the late 1980s. In 1991, the Belarusian parliament adopted the state symbols of the Belarusian Democratic Republic, the Pahonia and the White-red-white flag, as state symbols of the Republic of Belarus.

In 1993, the government of the Republic of Belarus held official celebrations of the 75th anniversary of the Belarusian Democratic Republic in Minsk. Members of the Rada BNR took part in the celebrations along with the senior political leaders of the Republic of Belarus. It was stated then that the Rada was not ready to return its mandate to the Supreme Council of Belarus, which had originally been elected under Soviet rule. The Rada was prepared to hand its mandate to a freely elected Belarusian parliament; however, these plans were cancelled after president Alexander Lukashenko, elected in 1994, established a return to Soviet policies in regards to Belarusian language and culture.

The Rada BNR continued its activities aimed at promoting democracy and independence for Belarus in the USA, Canada, the United Kingdom and Estonia. In the 2010s, the President of the Rada regularly held meetings with western policymakers and makes official statements criticizing the human rights violations and continuing Russification in Belarus. The Rada became a consolidating center for several exiled Belarusian opposition politicians.

Since the late 1980s, 25 March, the Independence Day of the Belarusian Democratic Republic, is widely celebrated by the Belarusian national democratic opposition as Freedom Day. It is usually accompanied by mass opposition rallies in Minsk and by celebration events of the Belarusian diaspora organizations supporting the Belarusian government in exile.

During the 2020–2021 Belarusian protests, the Rada of the Belarusian Democratic Republic expressed its support for the activities of Sviatlana Tsikhanouskaya and her office and declared her the "clear winner" of the 2020 presidential election.

Structure and functions
The Rada was intended to be a provisional parliament which would perform its functions till a constitutional convention of Belarus was held. The Rada BNR formed a government consisting of its members.

, the Rada sees itself as bearer of a symbolic mandate and as a guarantor of the independence of Belarus. The goal of the Rada is to transfer its mandate to a democratically elected Parliament of Belarus under the condition that no threat to the independence of Belarus should be present.

The Rada is led by the President of the Rada BNR (Старшыня Рады БНР) and a Presidium (Executive council) consisting of 14 members.

The Rada includes several Secretariates as working groups or individual secretaries responsible for specific areas, this include among others:
 Secretariate for External Affairs
 Secretariate for Internal Affairs
 Secretariate for Information
 Secretariate for Education

The activity of the Rada BNR is regulated by the Provisional Constitution of the Belarusian People's Republic and the Statute of the Rada BNR.

Presidents of the Rada BNR
 Janka Sierada (9 March – 14 May 1918)
 Jazep Losik (14 May 1918 – 13 December 1919)
 Piotra Krečeŭski (13 December 1919 – 1928)
 Vasil Zacharka (1928–1943)
 Mikoła Abramčyk (1943–1970)
 Vincent Žuk-Hryskievič (1970–1980)
 Jazep Sažyč (1980–1997)
 Ivonka Survilla (since 1997)

Presidium
The current presidium consists of:
 Ivonka Survilla – President
 Siarhiej Navumčyk, former member of the Supreme Soviet of Belarus and the Belarusian Popular Front – 1st Vice-President
 Viačasłau Stankievič, Belarusan-American Association – Vice-President
 Mikoła Pačkajeŭ, Association of Belarusians in Great Britain, former senior activist of the Belarusian Popular Front and Malady Front – Vice-President
 Palina Prysmakova, Board Member of the Belarusian Institute of America and the Krecheuski Foundation, Assistant Professor of the School of Public Administration at Florida Atlantic University - Secretary
 Viačasłau Bortnik, former Vice-President of the Belarusan-American Association 
 Aleś Čajčyc – Information Secretary
 Valer Dvornik – Treasurer
 Ała Kuźmickaja – Recording Secretary
 Ała Orsa Romano, president of the Orsa Romano Foundation – Secretary of Education
 Valancina Tryhubovič, Belarusan-American Association – Archivist 
 Alaksandar Starykievič
 Alaksandar Kot
 Pavał Šaŭcoŭ, Association of Belarusians in Great Britain
 Siarhiej Piatkievič, Association of Belarusians in Great Britain
 Hanna Surmač, Belarusan-American Association

Awards and decorations of the Rada of the Belarusian Democratic Republic
In 1949, the Rada of the Belarusian Democratic Republic in exile under President Mikola Abramchyk introduced a number of civic and military awards. There has been a number of decorations in the 1950s.

In 2016, the Rada of the BDR announced plans to renew the decorations. In 2018, the Rada awarded 130 Belarusian activists and politicians, as well as a number of foreigners, with a newly created medal commemorating the 100th anniversary of the Belarusian Democratic Republic.

Notable members

 Anton Adamovič
 Paluta Badunova
Janka Filistovič
Larysa Hienijuš
Vaclaŭ Ivanoŭski
Kastuś Jezavitaŭ
Jazep Mamońka
Michaś Naŭmovič
Mikola Ravienski
Symon Rak-Michajłoŭski 
Lavon Rydleŭski
Arkadź Smolič
Jan Stankievič
Zośka Vieras
Jan Zaprudnik
Raisa Žuk-Hryškievič

See also

 Council of Lithuania
 Estonian government-in-exile
 Latvian diplomatic service
 National Anti-Crisis Management
 United Transitional Cabinet

References

External links

 
Governments in exile
Politics of Belarus
Parliaments of Belarus
Belarusian diaspora
Political advocacy groups in Belarus
Advocacy groups
Anti-communist organizations